Daniel Masur (born 6 November 1994 in Bückeburg) is a German professional tennis player. Masur has a career-high ATP singles ranking of world No. 176, which he first achieved in March 2022 and in doubles of No. 149 achieved in September 2022.

Juniors
On the junior tour, Masur has a career high ITF junior ranking of No. 13 achieved in September 2012. Masur was a semifinalist at the 2012 US Open boys' doubles event, partnering Maximilian Marterer.

Professional career

2016–2018: ATP debut and first ATP match win
Masur made his ATP main draw debut as a lucky loser at the 2016 German Open in Hamburg in the doubles draw, partnering Cedrik-Marcel Stebe.

He won his first singles match on ATP-level as a qualifier at the 2018 German Open, defeating Maximilian Marterer in the first round.

2019
In the first round of the 2019 Hamburg Open doubles draw, he and partner Julian Lenz upset compatriots Alexander and Mischa Zverev after saving two match points.

2021: Major debut, Two Challenger titles, top 200
In March 2021, he won his first ATP Challenger singles title in Biella.

Masur qualified for the first time in his career for a Grand Slam main draw at the 2021 Wimbledon Championships.

In November 2021, he won the second 2021 Challenger Eckental title defeating Maxime Cressy. Following a third Challenger final in Bari, Italy he reached the top 200 at No. 183 on 29 November 2021.

Singles performance timeline

''Current through the 2022 Wimbledon Championships qualifying.

ATP Challenger and ITF Futures/World Tennis Tour finals

Singles: 16 (12–4)

Doubles: 11 (9–2)

References

External links

1994 births
Living people
German male tennis players
People from Bückeburg
Tennis players from Munich
21st-century German people